Liron Diamant (born 4 April 1990) is a former Israeli footballer.

References

1990 births
Israeli Jews
Living people
Israeli footballers
Beitar Jerusalem F.C. players
Maccabi Tel Aviv F.C. players
Hapoel Ramat Gan F.C. players
Hakoah Maccabi Amidar Ramat Gan F.C. players
Maccabi Petah Tikva F.C. players
Maccabi Herzliya F.C. players
Israeli Premier League players
Liga Leumit players
Footballers from Ramat Gan
Israeli people of Polish-Jewish descent
Association football forwards